The National Theatre is located in Downtown Washington, D.C., and functions as a venue for live stage productions with seating for 1,676.
Despite its name, it is not a governmentally funded national theatre, but operated by a private, non-profit organization.

History
The National Theatre was founded on December 7, 1835, by William Wilson Corcoran and other prominent citizens who wanted the national capital to have a first-rate theatre.  The theatre's initial production was Man of the World. The theatre has been in almost continuous operation since, at the same Pennsylvania Avenue location a few blocks from the White House. Its name was changed at times to "Grover's National Theatre," and "Grover's Theatre," as management changed. Famed actor Joseph Jefferson managed the theatre at one time. The structure has been rebuilt several times, including partial reconstructions after five fires in the 19th century. The current building, at 1321 Pennsylvania Avenue NW, was constructed in 1923, opening in September of that year.

Located three blocks from the White House, the theater has entertained every U.S. President of the United States since Andrew Jackson. On April 14, 1865, Tad Lincoln was attending a performance of Aladdin and the Wonderful Lamp at Grover's Theater when his father, President Abraham Lincoln, was assassinated at Ford's Theatre.

Like many theatres in the U.S. before the Civil Rights Movement, the National Theatre was racially segregated. Black actors were allowed to appear on stage, but African Americans audience members were relegated to a special section. During the Washington run of Porgy and Bess in 1936, the cast, led by Todd Duncan, protested the audience's segregation. Duncan stated that he "would never play in a theatre which barred him from purchasing tickets to certain seats because of his race." Management allowed for the first integrated performance at National Theatre. A movement to integrate the playhouse was spearheaded by actor Helen Hayes, educator Gilbert V. Hartke, O.P., Washington art impresario Patrick Hayes, and Washington Post theatre critic Richard L. Coe. When that effort failed, they persuaded Actors Equity performers to refuse to play at the theatre. Rather than desegregate, the New York management discontinued live performances in 1948. One prestige attraction, the Washington premier of the British film The Red Shoes, was presented. Earlier in 1941, Walt Disney's Fantasia played at the theatre for seven weeks, also as a prestige attraction. Then the theatre remained dark until it reopened as an integrated theater in 1952.

In 1970, the theatre came under the management of the Nederlander Organization. In 1974, the not-for-profit National Theatre Corporation was established  by Roger L. Stevens, Maurice B. Tobin, Donn B. Murphy, and others to save the failing enterprise, in the wake of racial riots, and a downtown made unfashionable by the growth of the surrounding suburbs.

The theatre underwent a major renovation in 1982–1983 when the original wing housing dressing rooms was replaced with a modern structure. The refurbished structure opened in concert with the redevelopment of that part of downtown Washington, D.C., which included The Shops at National Place, the 774-room flagship JW Marriott Hotel, and National Press Club. Stage designer Oliver Smith supervised the interior design.

The 1835 stone foundations and brick stage house still exist, although the rock work is now reinforced with steel caissons to resist erosion by the Tiber Creek, which flows beneath the building. From the stage, President Ronald Reagan saluted the refurbished "neighborhood theatre" in January 1984.

Among the Broadway productions which have had out-of-town try-outs at the National are Amadeus, Crazy for You, Hello, Dolly!,  If/Then, Show Boat, Mean Girls, and West Side Story.

In 2012, Jam Theatricals assumed operations for the theatre from the Shubert Organization. Jam Theatricals and Nederlander National Markets LLC merged in 2019, and the Nederlander family resumed management of the theater.

Performers
The many performers who have appeared at the theatre include Pearl Bailey, Ethel Barrymore, Lionel Barrymore and John Barrymore, Warren Beatty, Sarah Bernhardt, Claire Bloom, Edwin Booth, John Wilkes Booth, Fanny Brice, Tom Burke, Carol Channing, George M. Cohan, Claudette Colbert, Katharine Cornell, Hume Cronyn, Tim Curry, Denishawn, Ruth Draper, Todd Duncan, Maurice Evans, Craig Ferguson, Lillian Gish, Ruth Gordon, Valerie Harper, Julie Harris, Rex Harrison, Helen Hayes, Audrey Hepburn, Katharine Hepburn, Joseph Jefferson, James Earl Jones, Lucille La Verne, Eva LeGallienne, Jerry Lewis, Alfred Lunt and Lynn Fontanne, Eartha Kitt, Ian McKellen, Mary Martin, Ethel Merman, Idina Menzel,  Rita Moreno, Helen Morgan, Rosie O'Donnell, Laurence Olivier, Annie Oakley, Geraldine Page, Robert Redford, Debbie Reynolds, Chita Rivera, Will Rogers, Rosalind Russell, George C. Scott, Kevin Spacey, Sting, Jessica Tandy, Norma Terris, Marlo Thomas, Lily Tomlin, Franchot Tone, Rip Torn and Liv Ullmann.  Winston Churchill once spoke from the stage.

Operations

The National Theatre has expanded its activities to include not only Broadway musical performances, but also concerts, lectures, opera, ballet, seminars, and receptions. The National Theatre Foundation is the non-profit organization that oversees operations of the theatre, as well as management of a suite of free community engagement programs including Saturday Morning Live! At The National, Community Stage Connections, and Teens Behind the Scenes. David J. Kitto is the Executive Director. The National Theatre Group (Nederlander National Markets LLC) manages the daily activities of the theatre and provides content for the main stage.

Citations

See also
Theater in Washington D.C.

References
Stage for a Nation - The National Theatre - 150 Years by Douglas Bennett Lee, Roger L. Meersman, Donn B. Murphy, 1985

External links
The National Theatre
Burning of a Theatre, New York Times, 29 January 1873.
What If the Lincolns had Attended the Play at Grover's (National) Theatre?

1835 establishments in Washington, D.C.
League of Washington Theatres
Members of the Cultural Alliance of Greater Washington
Washington D.C., National Theatre (Washington, D.C.)
Theatres in Washington, D.C.